A large tornado outbreak of mostly weak tornadoes impacted the Southeastern United States and Central Plains. It began on May 2, predominantly in Mississippi, where around a dozen mostly weak tornadoes occurred. Several towns and cities sustained considerable damage, especially Tupelo, Mississippi, where a tornado emergency was issued for a nocturnal EF1 wedge tornado. Earlier, a large tornado, rated high-end EF1, ripped through areas southeast of Yazoo City, following a similar path to the deadly EF4 tornado from April 24, 2010. In Nebraska, multiple landspout tornadoes were reported, including an EF0 tornado that damaged a storage facility in Aurora. Two EF1 tornadoes caused damage in suburban areas west of Atlanta, while two non-tornadic fatalities occurred in the area due to falling trees. A large, radar-confirmed EF2 tornado prompted multiple PDS tornado warnings near Abbeville and Greenwood, South Carolina, damaging multiple homes and downing numerous trees. An EF1 tornado damaged multiple buildings in Ranson, West Virginia, injuring one person.

Southwest of Dallas, there were multiple tornado warnings and several tornadoes touched down, including one that inflicted major damage to a house near Blum, Texas and was rated high-end EF2. Eight more injuries occurred near Waxahachie, Texas when another EF2 tornado flipped vehicles on I-35E and caused significant to structures in the area. Severe weather activity continued into May 4, with numerous additional weak tornado touching down. Areas near San Antonio were pounded by large hail, including a hailstone that measured  in diameter in China Grove, Texas. This occurred just a week after another hailstorm affected the same area. The storms later organized into a massive squall line, producing widespread wind damage and several weak tornadoes. Overall, 97 tornadoes were confirmed. There were also four non-tornadic fatalities – two in Georgia, one in Tennessee and one in Virginia.

Meteorological synopsis

May 2
Three separate zones of severe weather were forecasted by the Storm Prediction Center for May 2. The first one was located in the Central High Plains, including Colorado and Kansas, where an enhanced risk was issued for potential of significant damaging winds, large hail, and a tornado or two. The second one was in the Lower Mississippi Valley and Central Gulf Coast, where a slight risk for damaging winds, large hail, and tornadoes was issued. A small marginal risk area for isolated large hail and damaging winds was also issued in parts of Iowa, Minnesota, and Wisconsin. Multiple rounds of severe weather moved through these areas. Several tornado warnings were issued and an EF0 tornado briefly touched down north of McClave, Colorado. This activity pushed into Kansas and Southern Nebraska, with the latter seeing several landspout tornadoes cause damage to several buildings. Farther to the southeast, several tornadic supercells formed in Louisiana, Mississippi, Alabama, with the brunt of the outbreak taking place in Mississippi, where 15 tornadoes touched down. A long-tracked high-end EF1 tornado caused extensive tree damage and destroyed mobile homes at the south edge of Yazoo City. A low-end EF2 tornado downed numerous trees, high-tension power lines, and damaged a home at the Holmes–Carroll County line. A tornado emergency was issued for Tupelo later that night when a cyclic supercell produced two EF1 tornadoes as it approached the area, the second of which caused considerable damage to homes and trees in the town. Another EF1 tornado caused damage in Calhoun City, where an old masonry building was completely destroyed.

May 3–4
On May 3, the SPC issued an enhanced risk from Central Texas to Western Kentucky for a 30% hatched risk area for wind damage, although a 10% hatched risk for tornadoes and a 30% hatched area for large hail was included for North Texas that afternoon. Severe weather began early in the day farther east, as two EF1 tornadoes caused damage in the Atlanta, Georgia suburbs, and an EF2 tornado downed many trees and damaged homes near Abbeville and Greenwood, South Carolina. Another EF2 tornado obliterated a manufactured home and caused major tree damage near Callao, Virginia. In Texas, a highly sheared and unstable environment resulted in scattered supercells and tornadoes that evening, a few of which were strong. A high-end EF2 tornado ripped the roof and some exterior walls from a house near Blum, while another EF2 tornado flipped vehicles and caused severe structural damage near Waxahachie, injuring eight people. An EF1 tornado also caused considerable damage in Fort Smith, Arkansas as well. On May 4, the SPC issued an enhanced risk for the Southeast, then upgraded it to a moderate risk for a hatched 45% risk for wind damage with a 5% risk for tornadoes. Numerous weak tornadoes touched down, especially in Tennessee, where the towns of White House, Gallatin, Lafayette, and Sparta all sustained minor damage from EF0 tornadoes. An isolated strong tornado occurred in Kentucky, where an EF2 tornado near Fulton tore much of the roof off a house, tossed a car, and snapped large trees.

Confirmed tornadoes

May 2 event

May 3 event

May 4 event

See also

List of North American tornadoes and tornado outbreaks

Notes

References

External links

2021 meteorology
2021 in Alabama
2021 in Mississippi
2021 natural disasters in the United States
May 2021 events in the United States
Tornadoes in Alabama
Tornadoes in Mississippi
Tornadoes of 2021
F2 tornadoes